Cardioglossa alsco is a species of frog in the family Arthroleptidae. It is endemic to Cameroon and is known from its type locality on southern slopes of the Tschabal Mbabo Mountains as well as from the Gotel Mountains, both in the Adamawa Region. Its range might extend into Nigeria. The specific name alsco is a patronym for the American Linen Supply Company (ALSCO). The company's German branch supported the expedition during which this species was discovered.

Description
Adult males measure  and adult females  in snout–vent length. The snout is rounded. The tympanum is visible. Males have a hypertrophied third finger. The toes have small but distinct discs and rudimentary webbing. The dorsum is tan and has three large dark consecutive blotches that may be well-defined but also show a varying degree fading, depending on a specimen. There is a broad black lateral band that runs from the tip of the snout through the eye and then descends towards venter at the mid-body. The flanks are immaculate pink. The arms and legs are dorsally tan and have some thin, broken black bands. The venter is blue and has varying degree of black speckling.

Habitat and conservation
It is associated with streams, the presumed habitat for the tadpoles. The types were found under large stones around shallow pools, adjacent to a creek running in a gallery forest. Males were calling at night during the dry season.

This species is threatened by habitat loss due to the clearance of forest for pasture; however, the remaining forest is difficult to access and is less susceptible to this threat.  The habitat remains vulnerable to threat of fire. Cardioglossa alsco is not known to occur in any protected areas.

References

alsco
Frogs of Africa
Amphibians of Cameroon
Endemic fauna of Cameroon
Amphibians described in 2004
Taxonomy articles created by Polbot